The Crab Orchard Mountains are a rugged, detached range of the southern Cumberland Mountains. They are situated in East Tennessee atop the Cumberland Plateau just west of the plateau's eastern escarpment, and comprise parts of Morgan, Anderson, and Cumberland counties. The mountains are made rugged by the erosion of many streams that have cut deep gorges into the mountains. The Crab Orchard Mountains are still one of the most rural areas in all of Appalachia.

References

Mountain ranges of Tennessee
Landforms of Morgan County, Tennessee
Landforms of Anderson County, Tennessee
Landforms of Cumberland County, Tennessee